Baomo Yuan is a Lingnan-style garden in Guangzhou, China. It is adjacent to its sister garden, Nanyue Yuan, and joint tickets are available.

Conception and etymology 

The garden was conceived in the late Qing dynasty in memory of Bao Zheng (999-1062), who was seen as an exemplar incorruptible official in the Northern Song dynasty, and said to have formerly resided at the site.

Bao Zheng is said to have put an end to an instance of corruption whereby officials had been pressing for an excessive number of inkstones from producers in fraudulent excess of the amount required as imperial tribute for personal gain. The garden's name is supposed to remind visitors of this story.

Features 
The garden features common elements of Chinese garden architecture such as ponds, bridges, pavilions, rocks.

History 

The garden was destroyed in 1957 and rebuilt in 1995.

See also 

 List of Chinese gardens

References 

Gardens in Guangdong
1995 establishments in China